Yan Dakai (1913–1997) was a People's Republic of China politician. He was born in Laoting County, Hebei. He was CPPCC Committee Chairman of his home province (1964–1967) and Tianjin (1979–1980). He was a delegate to the 4th National People's Congress and 5th National People's Congress and a member of the Central Advisory Commission.

References

1913 births
1997 deaths
Chairmen of the CPPCC Hebei Committee
Vice-governors of Hebei
People from Laoting County
Delegates to the 4th National People's Congress
Yan
Members of the Central Advisory Commission